"Addicted" is a song by Canadian rock band Simple Plan from the group's debut album No Pads, No Helmets...Just Balls. "Addicted" was released to radio on February 24, 2003. "Addicted" became Simple Plan's first top-50 hit in the United States, peaking at number 45 on the Billboard Hot 100. In 2004, it was re-released in Australia following the success of "Perfect" and reached number 10.

Track listings
UK CD single
 "Addicted" – 3:57
 "Surrender" – 2:58
 "Addicted" (video)

Australian CD single
 "Addicted"
 "Perfect" (acoustic version)
 "Grow Up" (live in Japan)
 "American Jesus" (live in Japan)
 "Simple Plan Loves to Go Down... Under" (live and backstage footage)
 Pat's scrapbook (exclusive Australian tour pictures)
 "Addicted" (video)
 "I'd Do Anything" (video)

Charts

Certifications

Release history

References

2001 songs
2003 singles
Lava Records singles
Simple Plan songs
Songs written by Pierre Bouvier
Songs written by Chuck Comeau
Songs written by Arnold Lanni
Songs written by Sébastien Lefebvre
Songs written by Jeff Stinco